Sebastian Rejman (born 13 January 1978) is a Finnish singer, actor, and television host. He is the singer and guitarist of the band The Giant Leap. While Giant Leap has been on hiatus, Rejman founded a new band called Sebastian & The 4th Line Band.

He represented Finland in the Eurovision Song Contest 2019 along with Darude. After performing 3rd in the 1st semi-final they didn't receive enough votes to place in the top 10 and failed to qualify for the Grand final.

Personal life
Rejman was born into a bilingual family, speaking both Finnish and Swedish. He has a son (born 2016) and a daughter (born 2019) with actress Iina Kuustonen.

Discography

References

Sources

Living people
21st-century Finnish male singers
Finnish pop singers
Eurovision Song Contest entrants of 2019
Eurovision Song Contest entrants for Finland
1978 births